This is a list of members of the Northern Territory Legislative Assembly from 1974 to 1977. This first Assembly only had limited powers, as the Northern Territory was not granted self-government until 1978.

 CLP member Bernie Kilgariff resigned to contest a seat in the Australian Senate on 16 July 1975; CLP candidate Eric Manuell won the resulting by-election on 7 February 1976.

See also
1974 Northern Territory general election

Members of Northern Territory parliaments by term
20th-century Australian politicians